Trois-Pistoles is a city in Les Basques Regional County Municipality in the Bas-Saint-Laurent region of Quebec, Canada. It is also the county seat. The town is located on the south shore of the Saint Lawrence River.

A ferry crosses the river to Les Escoumins on the north shore. The port facilities are also used by fishing boats and scuba divers.

The town is the site of the University of Western Ontario's annual French immersion program, which has existed since 1932. It is the oldest such program in Canada.

Just offshore of the town lies Île aux Basques, an island that was used by Basque whalers in the 16th century.  The island, part of the surrounding Municipality of Notre-Dame-des-Neiges, is a National Historic Site of Canada and is now a migratory bird sanctuary.

The town has hosted the Festival Échofête de Trois-Pistoles, an environmentalism-themed music festival and fair each July since 2002.  It is Quebec's largest environmental festival.

The town can be reached by Via Rail on the named train The Ocean, between Montreal and Halifax.

Etymology
The town is said to have been named for a silver goblet worth three pistoles, an old French coin, that was lost in the river in the 17th century.

Demographics 

Climate

Media
 FM 93.9 – CIEL-FM-4, adult contemporary
 FM 104.9 – CIBM-FM-2, hot adult contemporary

See also
List of cities in Quebec
Trois Pistoles station
Trois-Pistoles, a Belgian-style beer from Unibroue, a Quebec brewery now owned by Sapporo Brewery.

References

External links

 Ville de Trois-Pistoles

Cities and towns in Quebec
Incorporated places in Bas-Saint-Laurent